Sheikh Zayed Mosque may refer to any of the following mosques, being named after Sheikh Zayed bin Sultan Al Nahyan, the first and founding President of the U.A.E.:

 Sheikh Zayed Grand Mosque in Abu Dhabi, the U.A.E.
 Sheukh Zayed Mosque in Fujairah, the U.A.E.
 Sheikh Zayed Grand Mosque in Solo, Indonesia
 Zayed bin Sultan Al Nahyan's Mosque in Stockholm, Sweden